Ashok Inter School Daudnagar (formerly Ashok High School Daudnagar) is a fully funded public institution of Government of Bihar under the Department of Education. It is located in Daudnagar and was established in 1929. It is affiliated to Bihar School Examination Board (BSEB), Patna. 
It offers secondary education from IXth std to Tenth Class and now provides +2 higher secondary education in XIth and XIIth. The school is updated with library and computer facilities.

References

High schools and secondary schools in Bihar
Aurangabad district, Bihar
Educational institutions established in 1929
1929 establishments in India